Panagiotis Lagos (born 18 July 1985) is a Greek former professional footballer. Lagos had the ability to play in various positions as much as on the wings as on the center, due to the combination of the speed and technique of his play.

Club career

Iraklis
Born in Thessaloniki, Lagos started his professional football career with Iraklis in 2002. Having made 76 appearances for the club, he became one of the most important players in qualifying for Europe during the 2005–06 season.

AEK Athens
Lagos was a target of some Greek clubs, Olympiacos, Panathinaikos and PAOK. Lagos signed with AEK Athens for €1 million and was transferred from Iraklis in 2006. Lagos scored his first goal for AEK Athens against Atromitos in a 4–0 home win. In his first season at AEK, Lagos started his career with AEK before suffering a serious injury on his right leg in 2007, forcing him out of football for two years, and made his comeback near the end of the 2008–2009 season. Lagos' first game back from his injury was in a derby match against Panathinaikos. Lagos was a regular in the AEK Athens starting line-up, being played as a left wingback.

In 2010, Lagos renewed his contract with the club, signing a new three-year deal which kept him at the club until 2013. Lagos scored 2 goals against Larissa which led AEK winning 2–3. Lagos again suffered a knee injury against Anderlecht, which forced him out of football for three months. Lagos made his comeback against Ergotelis, where the match finished 1–1.

Vorskla Poltava
On 29 January 2013 Lagos signed a one and half-year contract with the Ukrainian club Vorskla Poltava.
He made his debut with the club on 3 March 2013 in an away 1–0 loss from Chernomorets.
On 3 March 2014, due to the political and military problems in Ukraine, Lagos decided to end his contract with the club

Apollon Smyrnis
On 9 July 2014 the "Light Brigade" announced the acquisition of Panagiotis Lagos. The 29-year-old full back-midfielder signed a one-year contract with the club and will play for Football League.It is worth noting that Lagos will be found for the first time in his career in a minor league in Greece, after his presence in Iraklis and AEK Athens (clubs that he measured a total of 186 appearances, 13 goals and 14 assists in 11 seasons).

International career
Lagos made his debut for Greece in 2006 against Korea Republic.
Due to his injury, Lagos has been dropped from the national side. Lagos has played 9 times for Greece.

Lagos competed for Greece at the 2004 Summer Olympics.

Lagos was recalled to the Greece squad by Fernando Santos to play against Malta in a Euro 2012 qualifier and a friendly match against Poland.

Career statistics

International
{| class="wikitable" style="text-align:center"
! colspan=3 | Greece national team
|-
!Year!!Apps!!Goals
|-
| 2006
| 6
| 0
|-
| 2008
| 2
| 0
|-
| 2011
| 1
| 0
|-
! Total
! 9
! 0

Honours
AEK Athens
Greek Cup: 2010–11

Individual
Greek Young Footballer of the year: 2005, 2006

References

External links
 
Guardian Football

1985 births
Living people
Footballers from Thessaloniki
Greek footballers
Greek expatriate footballers
Greece international footballers
Association football midfielders
Iraklis Thessaloniki F.C. players
AEK Athens F.C. players
FC Vorskla Poltava players
Apollon Smyrnis F.C. players
Super League Greece players
Football League (Greece) players
Ukrainian Premier League players
Expatriate footballers in Ukraine
Greek expatriate sportspeople in Ukraine
Olympic footballers of Greece
Footballers at the 2004 Summer Olympics
Greece under-21 international footballers